John W. Anderson (July 21, 1871 – January 29, 1954) was a justice of the Iowa Supreme Court from January 1, 1933, to December 31, 1938, appointed from Woodbury County, Iowa.

References

External links

Justices of the Iowa Supreme Court
1871 births
1954 deaths